Colombian Americans, are Americans who trace their ancestry to Colombia. The word may refer to someone born in the United States of full or partial Colombian descent or to someone who has immigrated to the United States from Colombia. Colombian Americans are the sixth-largest Latin American group and the largest South American Latino group in the United States.

Many communities throughout the United States have significant Colombian American populations. Florida (916,247) has the highest concentration of Colombian Americans in the United States, followed by New York (461,128), New Jersey (311,277), Texas (148,824) and California (134,929).

History
The first Colombian immigrants who settled in the United States likely arrived in the 1800s. However, the Colombian presence in the United States would not be known with certainty since the U.S. census included all the South Americans that lived in the United States in the "other Latinos" category.

The first community of Colombian origin was formed after World War I, through the arrival of several hundred professionals (nurses, accountants, laboratory technicians, pharmacists, and bilingual secretaries) that established themselves in New York City; later on, more people were added to the community when Colombian students decided to stay in the U.S. after they finished their studies. Most immigrants settled in Manhattan for many years until the late 1970s when they started to migrate to Jackson Heights, a middle-class neighborhood in the borough of Queens in New York City, that has good housing, schools and churches. The growth of the Colombian population was slow until 1940, when there was an increase in Colombian immigration to New York.

Post-World War II
Most Colombians who arrived after the mid-1960s wanted to stay in the United States for a specific time period. Therefore, the number of undocumented Colombian immigrants increased: from 250,000 to 350,000 people in the mid-1970s. Despite the promulgation of many laws against immigration, the number of Colombians that immigrated to the United States did not stop growing. Most of them immigrated to New York.  Smaller communities formed in Los Angeles, Houston, Philadelphia, and Washington, D.C. and in the 1970s, North Side, Chicago.

Since the 1980s, many Colombians have immigrated to Miami (especially in its suburbs, such as Doral, Kendall, and Hialeah, and the Weston suburb of Fort Lauderdale). The first Colombians immigrating to the city lived in Little Havana, from where they established commercial relations between Miami and Latin America. The area also attracted wealthy Colombians, who settled there for reasons as diverse as educational, medical or economics.

By the early 1990s, many Colombians left the metropolitan centers and settled in the suburbs to escape crime and high product prices in the city. This trend probably started for the first time in the coastal towns of Connecticut and New York. Colombian communities grew significantly in places such as Stamford, Connecticut, Union City and Englewood, New Jersey, Jacksonville, Florida (which attracted a growing number of people from Miami), and Skokie, Evanston, Arlington Heights and Park Ridge, Illinois. Despite the migration to other areas, the largest communities remained in New York City, Miami, and their environs.

In 1990 and 1991, 43,891 Colombians legally immigrated to the United States, surpassing immigrants from the rest of Latin America. They were for the first time the most populous group of undocumented immigrants in the United States from Latin America, excluding Mexico. Between 1992 and 1997, the intensity of the conflict in Colombia increased, so nearly 75,000 Colombians immigrated to the United States in this period, many of them going to California.

Causes of migration

In Miville's "Colombians in the United States: History, Values, and Challenges," the nature of Colombian migration is described. He writes,"Colombian migration patterns have been distinguished by scholars as three distinct waves involving diverse demographic groups, reasons for migrating, and contextual factors with a mixture of push and pull factors from both the originating and host countries (Madrigal, 2013; Migration Policy Institute, 2015). Immigration to the United States was essentially minor from about 1820 to 1950 when fewer than 7000 Colombians immigrated to the United States. Indeed, the Colombian presence in the United States was not recognized officially until 1960, when the U.S. Census began to specify the country of origin for South Americans (Migration Policy Institute, 2015)."
Economic problems and violence have led to an immigration of Colombians to the United States, particularly South Florida (especially in the suburbs of Miami, Florida such as Doral, Kendall, and Hialeah, and the Weston suburb of Fort Lauderdale), Central Florida, New Jersey (North Jersey), Queens County in New York City, Philadelphia, the Washington, D.C. metro area, eastern Long Island, and an expanding community in California, Texas and Georgia, mainly in the Los Angeles, Houston and Atlanta areas.

First Wave: After World War I, many Colombians immigrated to the United States in order to complete their education there, studying at the universities of the country. Most of them settled in New York. Many Colombians immigrated to the United States in order to complete their education, studying in universities across the country (Madrigal, 2013; Sassen-Koob, 1989). After the civil war in 1948 and increased poverty in Colombia, many Colombians also immigrated to the United States during the 1950s. In the 1960s, the economic crisis prompted the immigration of many Colombians to the United States, obtaining U.S. citizenship Between 1960 and 1977.

Second Wave (1965–1989): "The passage of several U.S. Immigration and Naturalization Act's amendments in 1965 allowed for more Colombians to migrate to the United States (Madrigal, 2013)"

Third Wave (1990–2008): "The 1980s and 1990s brought the rise in cocaine trafficking, along with the influence of the drug cartels and paramilitary groups (Carvajal, 2017; Migration Policy Institute, 2015). From the 1990s, along with the ensuing turmoil over a political assassination in 1989, the number of Colombians admitted to the United States tripled, representing the largest numbers of immigrants from a South American country (Carvajal, 2017; Migration Policy Institute, 2015)" Since the 1980s, many Colombians fled their urban cities to migrate to suburban areas in states like New Jersey and Connecticut, as their socioeconomic status improved. The conflict escalation between terrorists, paramilitaries, and narcos between 1992 and 1997 also boosted Colombian emigration during this period. As was discussed earlier, about 75,000 Colombians immigrated at that time to the United States, concentrating mostly in the state of California.

Demographics
As of the 2000 Census, 478,600 Colombians were living in the New York metro area and 369,200 Colombians were living in the Miami metropolitan area.  The largest Colombian community lives in the South Florida area (Doral, Kendall, Weston, and Country Club) and Jackson Heights in Queens County, New York City.

In New York City, a large Colombian community thrives and continues to expand in size since the wave of immigration began in the 1970s. Jackson Heights in Queens County was heavily Colombian during the 1980s, but other immigrant groups have settled in the area, notably Ecuadoreans and Mexicans. Many of the displaced Colombians have moved to adjacent areas such as Elmhurst, East Elmhurst, Corona, while wealthier Colombian Immigrants have gone further afield to College Point and Flushing. Queens County still has the largest concentration of Colombian in the United States of any county (roughly 155,000).

Ancestry

Ethnically, Colombian Americans are a diverse population including Colombians of European ancestry (mainly Spanish) ancestry,  Castizo (1/4 Amerindian/ 3/4 European) and mestizo (Half Amerindian/European), Afro-Colombians, and Colombians of Indigenous ancestry. In addition, many Colombians of Middle Eastern descent, notably Lebanese Colombians, also compose the Colombian diaspora.

Until 1960, most Colombians immigrating to the United States were white or mestizos. However, between this year and 1977, a period in which more than 186,000 Colombians immigrated to the United States, are becoming more ethnically diverse, representing the ethnic diversity of the population of Colombia. So today, although most Colombian are white and mestizos, there are also numerous Afro-Colombians in the Colombian population.

U.S. states with the largest Colombian-American populations

U.S. metropolitan areas with the largest Colombian populations
The largest populations of Colombians are situated in the following metropolitan areas (Source: 2023 estimate):

 New York-Northern New Jersey-Long Island, NY-NJ-PA-CT MSA – 697,472
 Miami-Fort Lauderdale-West Palm Beach, FL MSA - 636,091
 Orlando-Kissimmee-Sanford, FL MSA – 161,827
 Houston-Sugar Land-Baytown, TX MSA – 91,776
 Los Angeles-Long Beach-Santa Ana, CA MSA – 88,027
 Boston-Cambridge-Newton, MA-NH Metro Area - 78,554
 Tampa-St. Petersburg-Clearwater, FL MSA – 62,565
 Washington-Arlington-Alexandria, DC-VA-MD-WV MSA – 59,952
 Atlanta-Sandy Springs-Marietta, GA MSA – 46,027
 Dallas–Fort Worth-Arlington, TX MSA - 31,198

U.S. communities with high percentages of people of Colombian ancestry 
The top 25 U.S. communities with the highest percentage of people claiming Colombian ancestry are:
Victory Gardens, New Jersey 35.7%
Dover, New Jersey 33.5%
Kendall, Florida 31.5%
Doral, Florida 29.7%
Elizabeth, New Jersey 28.6%
Country Club, Florida 23.7%
The Hammocks, Florida 22.5%
Weston, Florida 21.7%
Central Falls, Rhode Island 20.4%
Sunny Isles Beach, Florida 20.3%
Montauk, New York 19.5%
North Bay Village, Florida 19.3%
Key Biscayne, Florida 18.8%
Englewood, New Jersey 18.5%
Guttenberg, New Jersey 17.2%
Morristown, New Jersey 16.9%
North Bergen, New Jersey 15.9%
Fontainebleau, Florida 15.8%
Kendale Lakes, Florida 14.6%
Virginia Gardens, Florida 12.2%
Richmond West, Florida 11.6%
Bay Harbor Islands, Florida 11.5%
West New York, New Jersey 10.9%
Hialeah Gardens, Florida 10.8%
Union City, New Jersey 10.5%

U.S. communities with the most residents born in Colombia
The top 25 U.S. communities with the most residents born in Colombia are:
Victory Gardens, NJ 23.2%
Dover, NJ 22.5%
Kendall, FL 17.3%
Elizabeth, NJ 16.5%
Country Club, FL 16.4%
Kendale Lakes, FL 15.1%
Doral, FL 14.3%
Ojus, FL 13.8%
The Hammocks, FL 12.7%
Katonah, NY 12.2%
Weston, FL 12.0%
Kendall West, FL 11.7%
Broadview-Pompano Park, FL 11.6%
Guttenburg, NJ 11.5%
Fontainebleau, FL 11.1%
Fort Devens, MA 10.9%
Greenbriar, FL 10.8%
South Bound Brook, NJ 10.6%
Sunny Isles Beach, FL 10.5%
Lakes-Lindgren Acres, FL 10.5%
Shinnecock Hills, NY 10.4%
Meadow Woods, FL 10.3
North Bay Village, FL 10.1%
Wabasso, FL 9.9%
Aventura, FL 9.8%

Top counties by number of Colombian immigrants according to estimates from the American Community Survey for 2015 - 2019 (national total: 761,400)

1) Miami-Dade County, Florida ------------- 96,100

2) Broward County, Florida ------------------- 61,300

3) Queens Borough, New York ------------- 50,700

4) Palm Beach County, Florida ------------- 23,600

5) Harris County, Texas ------------------------ 20,900

6) Orange County, Florida --------------------- 20,400

7) Los Angeles County, California -------- 17,400

8) Union County, New Jersey --------------- 15,400

9) Bergen County, New Jersey ------------- 14,700

10) Hillsborough County, Florida --------- 14,500

11) Hudson County, New Jersey --------- 13,800

12) Suffolk County, Massachusetts ---- 12,200

13) Suffolk County, New York -------------- 10,000

14) Osceola County, Florida ------------------ 9,700

15) Nassau County, New York --------------- 9,200

16) Fairfield County, Connecticut ---------- 9,200

17) Passaic County, New Jersey ----------- 9,100

18) Gwinnett County, Georgia ---------------- 9,000

19) Cook County, Illinois ------------------------ 8,900

20) Westchester County, New York ------- 8,500

21) Morris County, New Jersey -------------- 8,400

22) Brooklyn Borough, New York ----------- 7,300

23) Manhattan Borough, New York -------- 6,200

24) Montgomery County, Maryland -------- 5,800

25) Providence County, Rhode Island ---- 5,500

26) Lee County, Florida -------------------------- 5,300

27) Seminole County, Florida ----------------- 5,200

28) Middlesex County, Massachusetts -- 5,200

29) Orange County, California ---------------- 5,200

30) Middlesex County, New Jersey -------- 4,900

31) Fort Bend County, Texas ------------------ 4,600

32) Greenville County, South Carolina ---- 4,500

33) Philadelphia County, Pennsylvania -- 4,200

34) Pinellas County, Florida ------------------- 4,100

35) Collier County, Florida ---------------------- 4,000

36) Fairfax County, Virginia -------------------- 3,900

37) San Diego County, California ----------- 3,900

38) Maricopa County, Arizona ---------------- 3,800

39) Clark County, Nevada ----------------------- 3,500

40) New Haven County, Connecticut ------ 3,400

Culture

Religion
Colombian Americans, based on various studies and a survey, about 90% of the population adheres to Christianity, the majority of which (70.9%) are Roman Catholic, while a significant minority (16.7%) adhere to Protestantism (primarily Evangelicalism). Some 4.7% of the population is atheist or agnostic, while 3.5% claim to believe in God but do not follow a specific religion. In addition to the above statistics, 35.9% of Colombian Americans report that they did not practice their faith actively.

Language
A majority (82%) of Colombian Americans ages 5 and older speak English proficiently. The other 18% who are Colombian natives report speaking English less than very well, compared with 32% of all Latinos.

In addition, 83% of Colombians ages 5 and older speak Spanish at home.

Music and pastimes
Musical styles that are enjoyed by Colombian Americans include Vallenato and Cumbia.

The main pastime of Colombians in the United States is soccer, and most Colombian Americans raised in the United States continue to follow soccer. Another popular pastime, especially among the older generation, is parqués, a Colombian board game which is very similar to Parcheesi.

Food and drink

Colombian food is varied due to the several distinct regions of Colombia. Popular dishes include bandeja paisa, sancocho (chicken or fish soup with plantain), empanadas (meat-filled turnovers), pandebono and pan de queso (types of cheese-bread), and arepas (corncake similar to a tortilla). Colombian food is popular and well known in South Florida and in Queens County. Some of the most common ingredients are: cereals such as rice and corn; tubers such as potato and cassava; assorted legumes; meats, including beef, chicken, pork and goat; fish; and seafood.

Among the most representative appetizers and soups are patacones (fried green plantains), sancocho de gallina (chicken soup with root vegetables) and ajiaco (potato and corn soup). Representative snacks and breads are pandebono, arepas (corn cakes), aborrajados (fried sweet plantains with cheese), torta de choclo, empanadas and almojábanas. Representative main courses are bandeja paisa, lechona tolimense, mamona, tamales and fish dishes (such as arroz de lisa), especially in coastal regions where kibbeh, suero, costeño cheese and carimañolas are also eaten. Representative side dishes are papas chorreadas (potatoes with cheese), remolachas rellenas con huevo duro (beets stuffed with hard-boiled egg) and arroz con coco (coconut rice).
 
Representative desserts are buñuelos, natillas, Maria Luisa cake, bocadillo made of guayaba (guava jelly), cocadas (coconut balls), casquitos de guayaba (candied guava peels), torta de natas, obleas, flan de arequipe, roscón, milhoja, and the tres leches cake (a sponge cake soaked in milk, covered in whipped cream, then served with condensed milk). Typical sauces (salsas) are hogao (tomato and onion sauce) and Colombian-style ají.

Beverages

Colombian coffee is the world's most popular coffee and is renowned for its high quality and distinct flavor. Though much of the world's quality coffee beans come from Colombia, there are many Colombians Americans that drink instant coffee rather than brewed. It is popularly consumed as a "tinto", meaning black with sugar or panela on the side, or as café con leche, which is a preparation of half coffee and half heated milk.

Some other representative beverages are champús, cholado, lulada, avena colombiana, sugarcane juice, aguapanela, and hot chocolate.

Aguardiente is popular alcoholic drink derived from sugarcane and flavored with anise. It is widely consumed at Colombian parties, and ranges in potency from 20% to 40%. Aguardiente is a variation of the Spanish alcoholic drink.

Colombia cuisine also features a variety of tropical fruits such as cape gooseberry, feijoa, arazá, dragon fruit, mangostino, granadilla, papaya, guava, mora (blackberry), lulo, soursop and passionfruit. Colombia is one of the world's largest consumers of fruit juices. These juices have made their way to supermarkets all across the United States.

Socioeconomics
The annual personal income for Colombian Americans is $25,000, a figure higher than many other Latino groups at $21,900, but lower than that of the U.S. population at $30,000.

The rate of Colombian Americans homeownership is (45%) but lower than the 64% rate for the U.S. population as a whole. This takes into account the younger average Colombian American (Colombino) population.

Colombian Americans who live in poverty, 16%, is the same as the rate for the general U.S. population and lower than the rate for Latino overall at 25%.

Education
33% of Colombian Americans ages 25 and older—compared with 14% of all U.S. Latinos and 30% among the entire U.S. population—have obtained at least a bachelor's degree.

42% of U.S.-born Colombian Americans are more likely to have earned a bachelor's degree or higher, as compared to 30% of foreign born Colombians.

Notable people

Professional sports
Ice hockey
 Scott Gomez - played for 16 seasons in the NHL, from 1999 to 2016.

American football
 Kiko Alonso - linebacker

Soccer
Jorge Acosta - Played in various ASL teams, including a brief stint with the United States national team in the early 1990s.
Diego Chará - current player for the Portland Timbers.
Luis Carlos Perea - Former football player; son of Luis Alberto Perea and was named one of the 100 most prominent Latinos in Miami.
Juan Agudelo - Currently plays for New England Revolution in Major League Soccer  and for the United States national team.
Andrés Perea - Currently plays for Orlando City in Major league soccer; son of Nixon Perea.
Yimmi Chará - Current player for the Portland Timbers.
Alejandro Bedoya - Currently plays for Philadelphia Union in Major League Soccer and for the United States national team.
Wilman Conde, Jr. - Played in the MLS for the Chicago Fire in MLS.
Carlos Llamosa - Played in the MLS and for U.S. at 2002 FIFA World Cup, currently retired

Baseball

Lou Castro
Orlando Cabrera
Édgar Rentería

Cycling
George Hincapie - Tour de France competitor

Auto racing
Juan Pablo Montoya
Roberto Guerrero

Professional Wrestling

 Red Velvet - Currently wrestling at AEW.

See also

Colombians
German Colombian
Italian Colombian
Lebanese Colombians
Jewish Colombians
White Colombians
Spanish Americans
Afro-Colombians
Hispanos
Mestizo
White Hispanic and Latino Americans
White Latin Americans
Black Hispanic and Latino Americans
Afro-Latin Americans
Demographics of Colombia
Colombia–United States relations

References

Further reading
 Dockterman, Daniel. “Hispanics of Colombian Origin in the United States.” (Pew Research Center, May 26, 2011) online
 Sturner, Pamela. "Colombian Americans." Gale Encyclopedia of Multicultural America, edited by Thomas Riggs, (3rd ed., vol. 1, Gale, 2014), pp. 519–530. online

External links

The Colombian American Coalition of Florida

 
Hispanic and Latino American
 
Colombia–United States relations